Alister Kennedy (born 1978) is a Scottish international lawn bowler.

Bowls career
Kennedy won the fours gold medal and triples silver medal at the 2011 Atlantic Bowls Championships.

Kennedy became a Scottish national champion in 2013 after winning the pairs title with Billy Mellors at the Scottish National Bowls Championships. The pair subsequently became British champions the following year after winning the British Isles Bowls Championships.

References

1978 births
Living people
Scottish male bowls players